Borbona is a  (municipality) in the Province of Rieti in the Italian region of Latium, located about  northeast of Rome and about  northeast of Rieti.

Borbona borders the following municipalities: Antrodoco, Cagnano Amiterno, Cittareale, Micigliano, Montereale, Posta.

References

External links
 Official website

Cities and towns in Lazio